Aegis system equipped vessels (ASEV) or イージス・システム搭載艦 in Japanese is the designation for a proposed pair of ballistic missile defense (BMD) warships to be operated by the Japanese Maritime Self Defense Force (JMSDF) as dedicated sea-based BMD platforms, serving as an alternative to Japan's now-cancelled land-based Aegis Ashore BMD system.

Background

Two East Asian nations have nuclear weapons and the means to delivery such weapons — The People's Republic of China (PRC) and the Democratic People's Republic of Korea (DPRK) or North Korea. The range of PRC and DPRK missiles are illustrated below.
Chinese and North Korean missile ranges

People's Republic of China
The first of China's nuclear weapons tests took place in 1964, and its first hydrogen bomb test occurred in 1967. Tests continued until 1996, when China signed the Comprehensive Test Ban Treaty (CTBT) although the PRC is not a signatory of any multilateral nuclear arms limitation or reduction treaties. The People's Liberation Army Rocket Force (PLARF) controls China's arsenal of land-based ballistic missiles—both nuclear and conventional. The armed service branch was established on 1 July 1966 and made its first public appearance on 1 October 1984. The headquarters for operations is located at Qinghe, Beijing. The PLARF is under the direct command of the Chinese Communist Party's Central Military Commission (CMC).  The People's Liberation Army Navy Submarine Force (PLANSF) is the submarine service of the People's Liberation Army Navy (PLAN) and controls submarine-launched ballistic missile forces of the PRC.

In an online article dated 13 January 2023, research associate Timothy Wright of the International Institute of Strategic Studies (IISS) wrote that PRC has "significantly" boosted its strategic nuclear capabilities with ongoing upgrades to its submarine-launched and land-based nuclear forces, noting recent confirmation from recent official statements and published analysis from the U.S. Department of Defense.  The article also stated that the DoD raised its estimates of ICBM missile silos from 100 in 2022 to 300 in 2022 based on current trends. The DoD also estimated that the PRC had over 400 "operational" nuclear warheads in its inventory as of 2022 and could reach 1500 by 2035.

Democratic People's Republic of Korea

North Korea showed an interest in developing nuclear weapons dating back to the 1950s. The nuclear program can be traced back to about 1962, when North Korea committed itself to what it called "all-fortressization", which was the beginning of the hyper-militarized North Korea of today. In 1963, North Korea asked the Soviet Union for help in developing nuclear weapons, but was refused. The Soviet Union agreed to help North Korea develop a peaceful nuclear energy program, including the training of nuclear scientists. Later, China, after its nuclear tests, similarly rejected North Korean requests for help with developing nuclear weapons. The Korean People's Army Strategic Force (Korean: 조선인민군 전략군), is the  military branch of the Korean People's Army that oversees North Korea's nuclear and conventional strategic missiles. It is mainly armed with surface-to-surface missiles of domestic design as well as older Soviet and Chinese models. The KPA Strategic Force was established in 1999 when several missile units under KPA Ground Force Artillery Command were re-organized into a single missile force reporting directly to the office of the Supreme Commander of the KPA via the General Staff.

As of early 2020, North Korea's nuclear arsenal is estimated approximately 30 to 40 nuclear weapons and sufficient production of fissile material for six to seven nuclear weapons per year. North Korea has also stockpiled a significant quantity of chemical and biological weapons. In 2003, North Korea withdrew from the Treaty on the Non-Proliferation of Nuclear Weapons (NPT). Since 2006, the country has been conducting a series of nuclear weapon tests at increasing levels of expertise and frequency, prompting the imposition of sanctions.  More recently, on September 9, 2022, North Korea passed a law to declare itself a nuclear weapons state and rejected any possibility of denuclearisation.  In December 2022, North Korea ground-tested a solid-propellant rocket motor for potential use on either a land-based or submarine-launched Intercontinental ballistic missile (ICBM).

, North Korea has carried out 147 tests of strategic missiles since its first such test in 1984. 15 were carried out under the rule of Kim Il-sung and 16 under Kim Jong-il. Under Kim Jong-un, 119 tests have been undertaken as of December, 2019. An additional 8 missiles in 2021 and 63 in 2022 were subsequently launched (See bar chart below.), and a total of 7 North Korean missiles flew over the Japanese archipelago since 1998 (See table below, and the map and graph on the right.).

Number of missiles launched by North Korea per year since 1993 (as of 18 November 2022)

On 3 November 2022, North Korea reportedly fired at least one ballistic missile off its east coast, including one believed to be a long-range missile, that flew over and past Japan. The launch triggered the Japanese emergency broadcast system, which alerted residents in the prefectures of Miyagi, Yamagata, and Niigata to stay indoors.  Later, on 18 November 18, 2022, North Korea reportedly fired at least one ballistic missile into the sea on Friday, believed to be the first successful full flight of its Hwasong-17. The missile landed in Japan’s exclusive economic zone.

Note: Text, table, and graphics copied from List of North Korean missile tests; see that page's history for attribution.

Japanese Aegis Ashore program

Japan began developing its current ballistic missile (BDM) system starting in 2004. On 19 December 2017, the Cabinet of Japan approved a plan to purchase two Aegis Ashore systems equipped with the AN/SPY-7(V)1, based on Lockheed Martin's Long Range Discrimination Radar (LRDR) to increase Japan’s self-defence capability against North Korea, using SM-3 Block IIA missiles, and also could work with SM-6 interceptors capable of shooting down cruise missiles. The installation sites are at a Ground Self-Defense Force training area in Araya District, Akita Prefecture and the Mutsumi training area in Hagi, Yamaguchi Prefecture (See Map, Red: BMD FPS-5 radar, Yellow: BMD FPS-3 Kai radar, Blue: Air Defense Group, Anchor: JMSDF Aegis destroyers).

The proposed Japanese Aegis Ashore program would have been comparable to the land-based Aegis Ashore Ballistic Missile Defense System (AABMDS) sites deployed by the U.S. in Romania (pictured) and Poland (pictured). Test installation was built at the U.S. Pacific Missile Range Facility in Hawaii (pictured) in 2000s. A site in Deveselu, Romania is operational since 2016, while a site at Redzikowo, Poland was slated to become operational in 2022.

On 30 July 2018, Japan picked Lockheed Martin Corp to build a $1.2 billion USD radar for two ground-based Aegis ballistic missile defense stations. These are meant to guard against missile strikes. On the same day, Japan's Defense Ministry considered to withdrawing PAC-3 missile interceptor units from the country's northern and western region amid an easing of tensions with North Korea. Ministry officials noted that North Korea is less likely to fire ballistic missiles after it held a summit with the United States on the previous month. But the officials also said the ministry will maintain its order to destroy any incoming missiles. They added that the ministry will be ready to quickly redeploy the PAC-3 units if the situation changes.

Japan's Foreign Minister Hirofumi Nakasone and South Korea's Minister of Foreign Affairs Yu Myung-hwan agreed that the launch of the North Korean Unha-2 satellite on April 5, 2009, violated United Nations resolutions 1695 and 1718, both adopted in 2006. Japan's cabinet examined approval of a JMSDF AEGIS BMD engagement in the event of a failure of the Taepondong launch. The Japanese government also noted that it could bypass the Japanese Cabinet for an interception under Article 82, Section 2, Paragraph 3 of the Self-Defence Forces law. In total, five AEGIS destroyers were deployed at that time. Supplemental to SM-3 capability the Japanese system incorporates an airborne component. Together discrimination between platform tests and satellite launches is possible by analyzing the angle of ascent.

On 15 June 2020, Japanese Defense Minister Taro Kono announced that work had been halted on the deployment of the Aegis Ashore system because additional costs would be needed to ensure that residential buildings would not be hit by rocket boosters used to launch the missiles. Later in the month Japan's National Security Council confirmed the cancellation of Aegis Ashore. On 23 September 2020, Lockheed Martin noted the potential expense to convert the anti-aircraft (AA) system for maritime use since a revamp in the design is required.

JMSDF Aegis Afloat 

The JMSDF currently operates 4 , 2 , and 2  guided-missile destroyers as part of its "Aegis Afloat" program (See table below.).

On 6 October 2022, five warships from the United States, Japan, and South Korea held a multilateral ballistic missile defense exercise in the Sea of Japan (pictured) as part of the military response to ongoing North Korean intermediate-range ballistic missile tests over the Japanese home islands.

On 16 November 2022, the guided-missile destroyer  fired an SM-3 Block IIA missile, successfully intercepting the target outside the atmosphere in the first launch of the missile from a Japanese warship. Two days later, the  likewise fired an SM-3 Block IB missile with a successful hit outside the atmosphere. Both test firings were conducted at the U.S. Pacific Missile Range Facility on Kauai Island, Hawaii, in cooperation with the U.S. Navy and U.S. Missile Defense Agency. This was the first time the two ships conducted SM-3 firings in the same time period, and the tests validated the ballistic missile defense capabilities of Japan’s newest s.

Two additional IBCBMs were subsequently launched on 20 February 2023, with both landing in the Sea of Japan off the east coast of the Korean Peninsula.
List of Aegis Afloat ships

Design

In 2020, Japanese Defense Minister Nobuo Kishi announced plans to build 2 new Aegis destroyers to replace its scrapped land-based Aegis Ashore ballistic missile interceptors program.  On August 31, 2022, the Japan Ministry of Defense announced that JMSDF will operate two "Aegis system equipped ships" (イージス・システム搭載艦 in Japanese) to replace its earlier cancellation of the Aegis Ashore program, commissioning one ship by the end of fiscal year 2027, and the other by the end of FY2028. The budget for design and other related expenses are to be submitted in the form of “item requests” (i.e., engine components), without specific amounts, and the initial procurement of the lead items are expected to clear legislation by FY2023. Construction is to begin in the following year of FY2024.

The overall cost of building both ships is estimated to be 1 trillion yen ($7.1 billion USD). The first ship is planned to be commissioned in 2028 and the second in 2029.

Initial SWATH design approach
Preliminary design postulated that the ASEV would be based on the Small Waterplane Area Twin Hull (SWATH) configuration used by s, with the combined main deck area sufficient to accommodate the Aegis radar deckhouse and battery of SM-6 interceptor missile launchers. Such a SWATH-based configuration would be comparable to the 1986 CGH-67 design study (pictured) by the then David W. Taylor Naval Ship Research and Development Center of the U.S. Navy's Naval Sea Systems Command (NAVSEA) albeit without the explicit BMD orientation.

Current design
The overall size offers enhanced habitability for its 110-person crew for extended deployments and relative simplicity in construction, and it is designed to provide a stable platform for its advanced sensors and weapon systems. Once completed, the two warships will be the largest surface combatant ships in service with the JMSDF, and according to Popular Mechanics, they will "arguably [be] the largest deployable surface warships in the world."

However, in November 2022, both Kyodo News and Jiji Press quoted an unnamed senior official in Japan's Ministry of Defense who noted that the proposed ASEV warships might be downsized in a size similar to s as their original proposed beam significantly reduced speed and maneuverability, making the ships easier to detect and target by the enemy.  Later, on 23 December 2022, the Japanese MOD released additional 2023 budget and program guidance, including the first official illustration of the ASEV warship (See article info-box.), although no further details on ASEV ship dimensions were provided beyond the original facts and figures from the August 2022 release. USNI news editor Sam LaGrone noted that the overall design of the ASEV warship was comparable to the U.S. Navy's next-generation DDG(X) guided-missile destroyer (pictured).

Equipment

Ballistic missile defense systems
As a ship-based alternative to the land-based Aegis Ashore system, the Aegis system-equipped warships could be armed with the Standard Missile 6 (SM-6) Sea-Based Terminal (SBT) system (pictured), as well as the J7.B Aegis Weapon System and Lockheed Martin’s SPY-7(V)1 multi-functional radar, initially contracted for Aegis Ashore. According to Lockheed Martin, J7.B is the integration of SPY-7 into J7 (BL9), the latest software currently installed on JMSDF’s Aegis-equipped guided missile destroyers. The SPY-7(V)1 radar uses scaled equipment and software derived from the advanced Long Range Discrimination Radar (LRDR) located in the Clear Space Force Station, Alaska, and operated by the U.S. Missile Defense Agency (MDA).

In support of this objective, on 20 October 2022, the U.S. Department of State approved and the Defense Security Cooperation Agency (DSCA) notified the United States Congress that Japan is set to be the first country after the United States to field the Standard Missile 6 (SM-6) as part of a proposed $450 million USD Foreign Military Sale (FMS) arms package. Pending Congressional approval, Japan was conditionally approved to buy up to 32 of the Raytheon-built SM-6 Block I missiles. This notification is a follow-up of a 2017 decision from U.S. Department of Defense that conditionally approved Japan, South Korea, and Australia to buy SM-6 missile systems.

Weapon systems
The ASEV warships will be equipped to defend against Hypersonic Glide Vehicles, as such new hypersonic missile designs are too evasive for current ballistic missile defense systems to reliably intercept. Given the manpower requirements, non-BMD armament may be limited to such close-in self-defense weapon systems as Phalanx CIWS or SeaRAM.

On 16 December 2022, Defense Buildup Program (防衛力整備計画) document announced a 110.4 billion yen ($820 million USD) budget allocation to modify the JMSDF's Aegis-equipped guided missiles destroyers to carry Tomahawk land attack cruise missiles (TLAM). Although it is not stated what specific modifications are to be undertaken, Lockheed Martin's Tactical Tomahawk Weapons Control System (TTWCS) is the likeliest system to be integrated into the Aegis destroyers.  The Japanese government had previously approached the U.S. government to purchase the U.S.-made Tomahawk cruise missile for attacking enemy bases. The Japanese government decided to purchase the Tomahawk cruise missile before their domestically-built improved range Type 12 Surface-to-Ship Missile systems started full-scale operation.  The intent behind the JMSDF acquiring both long-range cruise missile systems is to act as a deterrent to North Korea, with the weapons able to strike naval and land targets.

On 23 December 2022, the Japanese Ministry of Defense released its 2023 budget and program guidance that featured the first official illustration of the ASEV warship, revealing that its missile arsenal will use the Mark 41 Vertical Launching System (Mk 41 VLS) grouped in two locations, forward of the bridge deckhouse and aft above the helicopter hangar.

Propulsion & power systems
Given the manning and electrical requirements, the Aegis system equipped vessels (ASEV) may require a highly automated, low maintenance, all-electrical propulsion systems such as:
 Integrated electric propulsion (IEP), an all-electric marine propulsion system that uses gas turbines or diesel generators or both components to generate three-phase electricity to power electric motors turning either propellers or waterjet impellors (See schematic.), and it used on the U.S. Navy's s and the Japanese icebreaker Shirace.
 Combined diesel and gas (CODAG) propulsion consists of diesel engines for cruising and gas turbines that can be switched on for high-speed transits, and it is used on the JMSDF's  and  helicopter carriers as well as s.
 Combined diesel-electric and diesel (COGLAG) propulsion, a modification of the combined gas and gas (COdAG) propulsion system employing electric propulsion for low-speed cruising, that is used on the JMSDF's  and  destroyers.
Given the lack of specific institutional expertise, technical support infrastructure, and political considerations, it is highly unlikely that the ASEV warships will use nuclear power for propulsion such as the Bechtel Corporation A1B nuclear reactor developed for the United States Navy's s to provide electrical power and propulsion. The released official illustration of the ASEV warship (pictured) displays a very prominent smokestack, strongly suggesting a non-nuclear propulsion plant in operation.

Operational concept

On 16 December 2022, the Japanese Cabinet approved a trio of defense-related policy documents, including its new National Security Strategy (NSS or 国家安全保障戦略), the strategic guideline document for the Japanese government’s policies regarding diplomacy, defense, and economic security for the next decade. Based on the NSS, the National Defense Strategy (NDS or 国家防衛戦略) document outlined Japan’s defense policy goals and the means to achieve them while the Defense Buildup Program (DBP or 防衛力整備計画) document outlined the scale of the introduction of specific defense equipment within the budgetary objectives. According to the Defense Buildup Program document, the JMSDF will increase the number of Aegis-equipped guided-missile destroyers (DDG) from the current 8 to 10 warships, as well as the introduction of two Aegis system-equipped vessels (ASEV) to be deployed in ballistic missile defense (BMD) operations. By the end of the decade, the JMSDF will operate 12 ships equipped with Aegis Weapon System (AWS) and likewise plans to replace its fleet of older, less capable destroyers and destroyer escorts with s.

On 23 December 2022, the Japanese Ministry of Defense's 2023 budget and program guidance documented provided examples of operations (運用の一例) for the Aegis-equipped naval forces of the Japanese Maritime Self Defense Force (MSDF).  The two ASEV warship would be exclusively tasked for dedicated ballistic missile defense (BDM) missions (BMD等) and operate off the Korean peninsula in the Sea of Japan, allowing the other Aegis guided-missile destroyers to meet other contingencies (侵攻阻止) while operating independently to maintain the maritime domain awareness (MDA) and keep the sea lines of communication (SLOC) open in the East China Sea southwest of the Japanese home islands (pictured).

Criticisms
Senior research fellow Brent Sadler of The Heritage Foundation criticized the proposed ASEV program, noting that the total of two units was insufficient to keep a AESV ship deployed continuously at sea. Sadler noted that the more typical operational cycle would require at least three ships, with one ship at sea on deployment, a second ship undergoing refit and upkeep following deployment, and a third ship going through work-up for deployment to relieve the first ship. Sadler also noted that the 2027–2029 timeframe to complete the construction of both AESV ships leaves Japan highly vulnerable during the interim period.  Regarding Japan's relative vulnerability, StrategyPage noted that the original Aegis Ashore BMD land-based facilities would not have been operational until 2024.

Additionally, senior defense analyst Felix Chang of the Foreign Policy Research Institute (FPRI) observed that the proposed ASEV warships would be extremely vulnerable to such next-generation Chinese long-range anti-ship cruise missile (ASCM) systems as the DF-21D and DF-26, with DF-21D having a range of 1,500 kilometers while the DF-26 has a range of 4,000 kilometers. Chang also mentioned that China has fitted its DF-21D missiles with maneuverable warheads that guide with terminal seekers to compensate and correct for any inaccurate targeting data.

Finally, senior fellow Zack Cooper of the American Enterprise Institute pointed out that a sea-based BMD system is overall not a more cost-effective alternative to a shore-based system. In 2020, Japanese news media reported that officials within the Japanese Ministry of Defense recognized that alternatives to the land-based Aegis Ashore system would all be significantly more expensive, by up to half again as costly.

Ships in the class

Naming conventions
Neither ASEV warship has been officially named. Ships of the JMSDF are known as Japan Ships (Go'[e]i:-Kan) and are classified according to the warship type. Guided-missile destroyers (DDG) are named after the names of places in Japan, such as mountains and provinces while more conventional destroyers (DD) are named after natural phenomena in the heavens or the atmosphere as well as mountains, rivers or regions.  It is not known if ASEV warship will have a new type designation such as guided-missile cruiser (CG) or ballistic missile defense ship (BMD Ship).

See also
Arsenal ship

CG(X)
DDG(X)

Strike cruiser

Type 055 destroyer

Notes

References

Bibliography

Official sources

Periodicals

External links

Japanese Ministry of Defense
 Ballistic Missile Defense (BMD) 
 Major Missile Defense Exercises

YouTube
China is getting restless, Japan will build two 20,000-ton missile defense warships – AZH M.H. – September 7, 2022
Japan is building massive Kirov-like battlecruisers? – Binkov's Battlegrounds – September 7, 2022
Watch out China — Japan to have two supersized warships! – Defense Updates – September 7, 2022
Japan is building 20,000-ton Mega Destroyers – Is this only for defence? – Eurasian Naval Insight – September 12, 2022
Japan Building Two Super-Sized Destroyers As An Alternative To Aegis Ashore – Secret Weapons – November 23, 20020
Japan's Genius Idea to Builds New World's Largest Warships since the End of WWII – Weapons of The World – December 30, 2022
Japan Navy Continues to Invest for Aegis System Equipped Vessels to Counterbalancing Threats – Public Nation – January 3, 2023

Proposed ships
Ships of the Japan Maritime Self-Defense Force
Ships built in Japan